

Overview
19 teams took part in the league with FC Dynamo Kyiv winning the championship.
FC Dynamo Kyiv qualified for Champions Cup 1967–68 and FC Torpedo Moscow qualified for CWC 1967–68 as runners-up of the Soviet Cup 1965-66.
The top 3 team with the most wins qualified for the World Cup.

League standings

Results

Top scorers
20 goals
 Ilya Datunashvili (Dinamo Tbilisi)

19 goals
 Anatoliy Byshovets (Dynamo Kyiv)

15 goals
 Boris Kazakov (CSKA Moscow)
 Nikolai Osyanin (Spartak Moscow)

14 goals
 Kazbek Tuaev (Neftyanik Baku)
 Oleg Kopayev (SKA Rostov-on-Don)
 Vladimir Kozlov (Lokomotiv Moscow)
 Gennadi Matveyev (SKA Rostov-on-Don)

12 goals
 Anatoliy Banishevskiy (Neftyanik Baku)
 Eduard Markarov (Neftyanik Baku)
 Eduard Streltsov (Torpedo Moscow)

References

 Soviet Union - List of final tables (RSSSF)

Soviet Top League seasons
1
Soviet
Soviet